Toothpick Bridge is the third album by the band Ist, and was released on August 17, 2009.

Track listing

All songs: Hall/Haynes/McCourt/Richardson except

'*' Hall/Haynes/McCourt/Richardson/Birtles/Barrow 
and

'**' Hall/Hewick/Haynes/McCourt/Richardson/Birtles/Barrow

"The Boy's Not Right" - 3:07
"Pep Talk" – 3:06 *
"Headache" – 3:21
"Rebecca" – 2:25
"A Scotsman in A Church" ** – 1:54
"Would You Buy A Bible From This Man?" – 5:31
"Demand" – 1:44
"Remington Steele" – 3:18
"Social Workers #12 & 35" * – 2:14
"Company of Sense" – 3:15
"This Must Be The Desert"* – 3:00
"You Should Be Ashamed" – 4:06
"Yer Man's A Bingo Caller"* – 2:20
"She Clears Her Throat"* – 4:54

Personnel
Kenton Hall - guitar, toys, e-bow, vocals
John McCourt - bass, mandolin, vocals, 
Brett Richardson - guitar, bassoon, vocals, string arrangements, keyboards
Flash - percussion, drums
Paul Swannell - piano, keyboards
John Budding - piano, keyboards
Gaz Birtles - alto sax, harmonica, flute
John Barrow - tenor sax
Dean Sargent - trumpet
Jay Lyndsay - trombone
Dorie Jackson - vocals
Melvin Duffy - pedal steel, Weissenbourne
Kevin Hewick - Additional Scotsmen
Caroline O'Donnell - accordion
 Jay Burnett - Additional percussion, noises and studio witchcraft.

2009 albums